The VT-4, also known as the MBT-3000, is a Chinese third generation main battle tank built by Norinco for overseas export.

Development 
During the development of Type 90-II/Al-Khalid (also known as MBT-2000) in the 1980s, the gearbox and engine were originally imported from Germany, but this plan was shelved due to the Western arms embargo. The powertrain instead was sourced from Ukraine, the same for most Chinese export vehicles at the time.

China eventually developed domestic powertrains, which led to the creation of the MBT-3000 program for export customers. MBT-3000 was the successor of the Type-90II (MBT-2000) export tank. The MBT-3000 project later named as VT-4 began development in 2009 as a co-operation with First Inner Mongolia Machinery Factory and other companies.

The MBT-3000 concept debuted at the 2012 Eurosatory. The tank was subsequently shown at the 2014 Norinco Armor Day and the 10th China International Aviation & Aerospace Exhibition as the VT-4.

Design

The VT-4 shares many subsystems technology and features from other latest Chinese main battle tanks such as Type 96B and Type 99A. Key examples are an automatic transmission system, 125mm smoothbore cannon, muzzle reference system, FY-4 ERA, carousel style autoloader, and overall geometry.

Armament 
The VT-4 has a 125mm smoothbore cannon capable of firing APFSDS, HESH, HEAT and HE rounds and guided missiles. There is also a remote weapon station on the turret armed with a 12.7 mm heavy machine gun. The fire control system has hunter-killer capabilities, laser rangefinder, panoramic sight, and a third-generation thermal imaging system. According to the chief designer, the APFSDS used by VT-4 can reach 700mm penetration which is enough to penetrate any armoured target, although the distance in which 700mm of penetration was achieved was not disclosed.

Protection 
The tank is protected by dual-layer protection consisting of composite armor and FY-4 explosive reactive armour. According to the chief designer Feng Yibai, the frontal protection force is equivalent to 500mm homogeneous steel armor, and the explosive reaction armor is around 700mm. Although not the best protection on the market it's been said that this level of protection is sufficient for the needs of developing nations. The front turret has wedge-shaped armor similar to other contemporary Chinese MBT's and the hull sides have conventional metal sideskirts. The tank can be equipped with a ′hardkill′ active protection system designated GL5, defensive grenade launchers and a laser warning device. The vehicle also has an IFF system, NBC protection, explosion-suppression system, fire-extinguishing system and air conditioning.

Mobility 

According to Norinco, the VT-4 uses a locally produced 1,300 hp diesel engine with torsion bar suspension and an integrated hydraulic transmission system. Steering and acceleration is handled by a steering wheel and automatic gear transmission. VT-4 is also capable of neutral steering.

Command and control 
The tank is also integrated with digital communications systems for tank-tank communication and communication between commanders.

Variants
MBT-3000 Prototype.
VT-4 Production model.
VT-4A1 Improved model with a modified turret. The new turret features radar panels, repositioned grenade dischargers, new hard-kill active protection system and a launcher for small attack drones.
VN20 Heavy Infantry Fighting Vehicle

Operators
 
Vehicles delivered to the Nigerian Army in April 2020.

300 VT-4 tanks will be delivered to the Pakistan army by 2023 along with an option for 160 more in accordance to the 2017 deal.
 
The Royal Thai Army has 38 VT-4 in service, with the first 28 delivered in October 2017. The deal, thought to be valued at about US$150 million, included an option to buy a further 153 vehicles. In April 2017, the Royal Thai Army ordered an additional 10 VT-4 main battle tanks from China North Industries Corporation (NORINCO) worth US$58 million that was delivered as of early 2019.

See also
 Al-Khalid tank
 Type 99 tank - Similar Chinese third-generation MBT
 VN20 - Heavy Infantry Fighting Vehicle developed from the VT-4 Chassis

References

External links

CCTV news footage of VT-4 driving past obstacles
 

Main battle tanks of China
Post–Cold War main battle tanks
Tanks with autoloaders
Military vehicles introduced in the 2010s
Norinco